Cantrill is an occupational surname, for a bellman, first recorded in Staffordshire, England.

Arthur and Corinne Cantrill, Australian filmmakers and commentators
 Bryan Cantrill, American software developer
 Hadley Cantril (1906–1969), American researcher of public opinion
 James E. Cantrill (1839–1908), Captain in the Confederate States Army Cavalry, politician and judge
 J. Campbell Cantrill (1870–1923),  U.S. Representative from Kentucky
Andrew Cantrill, British organist and choral director

References

English-language surnames